In rotational-vibrational and electronic spectroscopy of diatomic molecules, Hund's coupling cases are idealized descriptions of rotational states in which specific terms in the molecular Hamiltonian and involving couplings between angular momenta are assumed to dominate over all other terms.  There are five cases, proposed by Friedrich Hund in 1926-27 and traditionally denoted by the letters (a) through (e).  Most diatomic molecules are somewhere between the idealized cases (a) and (b).

Angular momenta 
To describe the Hund's coupling cases, we use the following angular momenta (where boldface letters indicate vector quantities):
, the electronic orbital angular momentum
, the electronic spin angular momentum
, the total electronic angular momentum
, the rotational angular momentum of the nuclei
, the total angular momentum of the system (exclusive of nuclear spin)
, the total angular momentum exclusive of electron (and nuclear) spin

These vector quantities depend on corresponding quantum numbers whose values are shown in molecular term symbols used to identify the states. For example, the term symbol 2Π3/2 denotes a state with S = 1/2, Λ = 1 and J = 3/2.

Choosing the applicable Hund's case 
Hund's coupling cases are idealizations.

For 1Σ states the orbital and spin angular momenta are zero and the total angular momentum is just the nuclear rotational angular momentum. For other states, Hund proposed five possible idealized modes of coupling.

The last two rows are degenerate because they have the same good quantum numbers.

In practice there are also many molecular states which are intermediate between the above limiting cases.

Case (a) 
Then both  and  have well-defined axial components,  and  respectively. As they are written with the same Greek symbol, the spin component  should not be confused with  states, which are states with orbital angular component  equal to zero.  defines a vector of magnitude  pointing along the internuclear axis. Combined with the rotational angular momentum of the nuclei , we have .

However  is not a good quantum number because the vector  is strongly coupled to the electrostatic field and therefore precesses rapidly around the internuclear axis with an undefined magnitude. For example, a 2Π state has a 2Π1/2 term (or fine structure state) with rotational levels  = 1/2, 3/2, 5/2, 7/2, ... and a 2Π3/2 term with levels  = 3/2, 5/2, 7/2, 9/2.... Case (a) requires  > 0 and so does not apply to any Σ states, and also  > 0 so that it does not apply to any singlet states.

The selection rules for allowed spectroscopic transitions depend on which quantum numbers are good. In addition, symmetrical diatomic molecules have even (g) or odd (u) parity and obey the Laporte rule that only transitions between states of opposite parity are allowed.

Case (b) 
In case (b), the spin-orbit coupling is weak or non-existent (in the case ).

For example, a 2Σ state has rotational levels  = 0, 1, 2, 3, 4, ..., and each level is divided by spin-orbit coupling into two levels  =  ± 1/2 (except for  = 0 which corresponds only to  = 1/2 because  cannot be negative).
 
Another example is the 3Σ ground state of dioxygen, which has two unpaired electrons with parallel spins.

However for the rotational levels, the rule for quantum number  does not apply and is replaced by the rule .

Case (c) 
Instead  and  combine to form , which has a projection along the internuclear axis of magnitude . Then , as in case (a).

An example of Hund's case (c) is the lowest 3Πu state of diiodine (I2), which approximates more closely to case (c) than to case (a).

Case (d) 

Because  is a good quantum number, the rotational energy is simply .

Case (e) 
This case is rare but has been observed. Rydberg states which converge to ionic states with spin–orbit coupling (such as 2Π) are best described as case (e).

References 

Spectroscopy